Journal of Transportation Engineering was a journal published by the American Society of Civil Engineers. Prior to 1968, it was known as Journal of the Highway Division, and from 1968 to 1982 it was known as the Transportation Engineering Journal of ASCE, taking the current name in 1983. In 2017 it split into
Journal of Transportation Engineering, Part A: Systems
Journal of Transportation Engineering, Part B: Pavements

American Society of Civil Engineers academic journals
Transportation journals
English-language journals
Publications with year of establishment missing